Eupseudosoma larissa is a moth of the family Erebidae first described by Herbert Druce in 1890. It is found in the Amazon region.

References

Phaegopterina
Moths described in 1890